I Still Believe may refer to:

 I Still Believe (album), by Lyfe Jennings, 2010
 I Still Believe (film), a 2020 American film based on the life of singer Jeremy Camp

Songs
 "I Still Believe" (Brenda K. Starr song), 1988; covered by Mariah Carey, 1999
 "I Still Believe" (Frank Turner song), 2010
 "I Still Believe" (Jeremy Camp song), 2003
 "I Still Believe" (Juliette Schoppmann song), 2004
 "I Still Believe" (Lee Greenwood song) 1988
 "I Still Believe", by Hayden Panettiere from the film Cinderella III: A Twist in Time
 "I Still Believe", by Ric Ocasek from Quick Change World
 "I Still Believe", from the musical Miss Saigon
 "I Still Believe (Great Design)", by the Call
 "I Still Believe", a cover version by Tim Cappello from The Lost Boys: Original Motion Picture Soundtrack